Herbert Duncan may refer to:

 Herbert Cecil Duncan (1895–1942), British Indian Army general
 Herbert Osbaldeston Duncan (1862–1945), English racing bicyclist, journalist and automobile pioneer